"The River of Blood" is a monument located on a golf course in Lowes Island, Virginia, owned by Donald Trump. A plaque signed with Trump's name states that the monument marks what Trump claims is an American Civil War battle site having significant casualties, although no listed battle nor publicly disclosed event with any recorded casualties took place at the site.

Monument 
The site is on one of two golf courses belonging to the Trump National Golf Club on Lowes Island. Donald Trump acquired the club (formerly known as the Lowes Island Club) in 2009 for $13 million.

On the course, between the 14th hole and the 15th tee, Trump had a stone pedestal built with a flagpole on it, and had a plaque placed on the pedestal with the inscription:

Many great American soldiers, both of the North and South, died at this spot, "The Rapids", on the Potomac River. The casualties were so great that the water would turn red and thus became known as "The River of Blood".

The plaque bears Trump's name and the Trump Organization's crest.  The accompanying text reads, "It is my great honor to have preserved this important section of the Potomac River!"

Historical accuracy 
No such event ever took place at this site. One local historian, Craig Swain, cited the killing of two soldiers by citizens in 1861 as the only Civil War event that occurred on the island.

Two years later, on June 27–28, 1863, General J.E.B. Stuart led 4,500 Confederate soldiers north across the Potomac at Rowser's Ford from the Lowes Island area, on the ride to Gettysburg, but no fatalities were recorded.

According to the president of the Virginia Piedmont Heritage Area Association, the only Civil War battle in the area was the Battle of Ball's Bluff,  upriver. Other historians consulted by The New York Times for a story in 2015 agreed; one of them had written to the Trump Organization about the falsehood. Trump himself disputed the historians' statements:

That was a prime site for river crossings. So, if people are crossing the river, and you happen to be in a civil war, I would say that people were shota lot of them.

"How would they know that?" Mr. Trump asked when told that local historians had called his plaque a fiction. "Were they there?"

Trump said that "numerous historians" had told him the story of the River of Blood, though he later changed that to say the historians had spoken to "my people". Finally he said, "Write your story the way you want to write it. You don't have to talk to anybody. It doesn't make any difference. But many people were shot. It makes sense."

According to Jack Holmes of Esquire magazine, the ahistorical marker is symptomatic of the Trump administration; Jack Holmes points at other historical blunders made by members of the Trump administration, including Kellyanne Conway's reference to the non-existent Bowling Green massacre and Sean Spicer's claim that even Hitler had not used chemical weapons in conventional warfare, although Zyklon-B was used to exterminate prisoners in the Holocaust.

Other commentators looked at Trump's golf-course plaque in the context of his many-time expressed admiration for President Andrew Jacksonespecially evident in May 2017, when President Trump appeared to suggest that he believed that Jackson lamented the Civil War (and could have stopped it) despite Jackson having died sixteen years before its outbreak.

References

Fictional battles
Buildings and structures in Loudoun County, Virginia
Donald Trump controversies
Monuments and memorials in Virginia
Pseudohistory
American Civil War military monuments and memorials
Virginia in the American Civil War